Shenjiaying Town is a town in the Yanqing District of Beijing. It shares border with Zhangshanying and Jiuxian Towns in the north, Yongning Town in the east, Jingzhuang and Dayushu Towns in the south, and Yanqing Town in the west. In 2020, it was home to 16,661.

This town's name refers to Shenjiaying Village, where the town's government is located.

Geography 
Shenjiaying Town is on Guishui River's alluvial plain, within the Yanhuai Basin. Both Beijing-Yinchuan Highway and Datong–Qinhuangdao railway go through the town.

History

Administrative divisions 
As of 2021, Shenjiaying Town had direct jurisdiction over 25 subdivisions, consisted of 3 communities and 22 villages. They are listed as follows:

See also 

 List of township-level divisions of Beijing

References

Yanqing District
Towns in Beijing